Albert Hedderich (born 11 December 1957 in Mainz) is a retired German rower who won a gold medal at the 1984 Summer Olympics in Los Angeles.

References

External links
 
 

Rowers at the 1984 Summer Olympics
Olympic rowers of West Germany
Olympic gold medalists for West Germany
1957 births
Living people
Olympic medalists in rowing
West German male rowers
Medalists at the 1984 Summer Olympics
World Rowing Championships medalists for West Germany
Sportspeople from Mainz